Gerald Busby (born December 16, 1935) is a Texas-born American composer.

Busby was born in Tyler, Texas.  He studied piano as a child, playing with the Houston Symphony when he was fifteen. He attended Yale where he studied music in college, but once graduated, began working as a traveling salesman. At age 40 he had an "epiphany" and began to compose, a direction which surprised him.

In 1977, with the assistance of Virgil Thomson, he moved to the Hotel Chelsea in New York City where he has written most of his work. Living at the Hotel Chelsea brought him into contact with numerous cultural figures. One of them was dancer Rudolf Nureyev and his then-partner Wallace Potts. Potts gave Paul Taylor a recording by Busby's music, which led to Busby writing the score for Taylor's dance Runes. Regarding his scores for Paul Taylor's dance "Runes" and Robert Altman's film 3 Women, Busby said "Those two pieces are acknowledged as masterpieces, so that I know they’ll last beyond me,” Mr. Busby said. “Not because what I did was a masterpiece, but I was part of it."

In 1985 Busby was diagnosed with HIV as was his partner Samuel Byers.  Byers died on December 14, 1993; the couple had been together for 18 years. "Sam’s death was just unbearable...He lost his mind and withered away. I was there the whole time with him and taking care of him, so I just went nuts." After a bout of depression and drug addiction, he became sober and began composing again. In 2007, his monthly income amounted to $658 from Social Security, $78 in disability payments, and $156 in food stamps.  Income from his music was undependable; in a good month he could get $1000, or nothing. The New York Times ran him as one of their "most neediest cases." Through the Federation of Protestant Welfare Agencies, Busby was able to receive $754.96 for digitizing recordings originally made on perishable cassette tape.

Despite being HIV positive, he claims that his immune system has regenerated, something he attributes to his daily practice of reiki. He continues to live at the Hotel Chelsea.

References

Bibliography

1935 births
American male classical composers
American classical composers
American film score composers
American opera composers
Male opera composers
Ballet composers
Living people
People from Tyler, Texas
20th-century classical composers
21st-century classical composers
Reiki practitioners
Classical musicians from Texas
American male film score composers
20th-century American male musicians
21st-century American male musicians